The University Hospital "Shefqet Ndroqi" is a tuberculosis sanatorium established in Fuat Bey Hill, Tirana in 1945. The hospital has more than 100 beds and various room types and facilities.

See also
Ministry of Health

http://www.sushefqetndroqi.gov.al/historiku/

External links
 SU "Shefqet Ndroqi" (Official website)

Hospitals in Albania